This list contains musical works which were inspired by or contain lyrics referring to the September 11 attacks.

See also
 List of songs deemed inappropriate by Clear Channel following the September 11, 2001 attacks
 List of cultural references to the September 11 attacks (classical music)

References 

September 11

21st century-related lists
September 11
2001-related lists
World Trade Center